Mahmoud Al-Mawas (born 1 January 1993) is a Syrian professional footballer who plays for Al-Shorta in the Iraqi Premier League and the Syria national team. He made his international debut with Syria in 2012, aged 19.

Club career 
Mawas started his career with Al-Karamah, where he won his first trophy, the 2009–10 Syrian Cup. Later on, he played abroad for Al-Riffa, Al-Arabi, Al-Faisaly, Al-Muharraq and Umm Salal. In October 2020, he returned to Syria to train with Taliya.

In late October 2020, Romanian journals reported that he agreed to join FC Botoșani. On 11 December 2020, he made his debut for Botoșani in a 1–1 draw against Astra Giurgiu.

International career 
Al-Mawas represented Syria in the 2012 Summer Olympics Asian qualifiers. He also played at the 2008 AFC U-16 Championship in Uzbekistan.

Career statistics

International
As of match played 7 June 2021. Syria score listed first, score column indicates score after each Al Mawas goal.

Honours

Club 
Al-Karamah 
 Syrian Cup: 2010

Al-Arabi 
 Kuwait Federation Cup: 2013–14
 Kuwait Crown Prince Cup: 2014–15

Al-Shorta
 Iraqi Premier League: 2021–22
 Iraqi Super Cup: 2022

Individual 
Iraqi Premier League top scorer: 2021–22 (22 goals)

References

External links 
 

1993 births
Living people
People from Hama
Association football midfielders
Syrian footballers
Expatriate footballers in Bahrain
Expatriate footballers in Kuwait
Expatriate footballers in Saudi Arabia
Expatriate footballers in Qatar
Syrian expatriate sportspeople in Bahrain
Syrian expatriate sportspeople in Kuwait
Syrian expatriate sportspeople in Saudi Arabia
Syrian expatriate sportspeople in Qatar
Syrian expatriate footballers
Al-Karamah players
Al-Faisaly FC players
Al-Arabi SC (Kuwait) players
Umm Salal SC players
Saudi Professional League players
Qatar Stars League players
2019 AFC Asian Cup players
Syrian Premier League players
Syria international footballers
Expatriate footballers in Romania
FC Botoșani players
Liga I players
Kuwait Premier League players
Syrian expatriate sportspeople in Romania
Al-Muharraq SC players
Riffa SC players
Bahraini Premier League players
Al-Shorta SC players
Syrian expatriate sportspeople in Iraq
Expatriate footballers in Iraq
Iraqi Premier League players